Hyalobathra archeleuca is a moth in the family Crambidae. It was described by Edward Meyrick in 1885. It is found in Australia, where it has been recorded from New South Wales and Queensland.

References

Moths described in 1885
Pyraustinae